Walkley is a bus station on Ottawa's transitway served by OC Transpo buses. It is located in the south-eastern transitway section at Walkley Road in Ottawa, Ontario, Canada. There are also plans for mixed-use development all around the station which is vacant.

In 2023, a new infill station on the O-Train Trillium Line will open at Walkley.

Service

The following routes serve Walkley station as of May 3, 2020:

Notes 
 Route  is available nearby at the corner of Bank and Walkley.
 Route  only serves stop 3A during the AM weekday peak periods. It does not serve stop 4A during the PM weekday peak periods.

References

External links
OC Transpo station page
OC Transpo Area Map

Railway stations scheduled to open in 2023
Trillium Line stations
Transitway (Ottawa) stations